Pencak silat competitions at the 2021 Southeast Asian Games took place at Bắc Từ Liêm District Sporting Hall in Hanoi, Vietnam between 10 and 16 May 2022.

Medal table

Medalists

Seni (artistic)

Tanding (match)

Men

Women

References

External links
  

2021 Southeast Asian Games events
2021